The Americas Zone was one of three zones of regional competition in the 2002 Fed Cup.

Group I
Venue: San Luis Potosí, Mexico (outdoor hard) 
Date: 23–27 April

The nine teams were divided into two pools of four and five teams. The teams that finished first in the pools played-off against those that placed second to determine which team would partake in the World Group Play-offs. The two nations coming last in the pools were relegated to Group II for 2003.

Pools

Play-offs

  and  advanced to 2002 World Group Play-offs.

Group II
 Venue: Havana, Cuba (outdoor hard) 
 Date: 14–18 May

The twelve teams were divided into two pools of six. The top team from each pool then advanced to Group I for 2003.

Pools

  and  advanced to Group I in 2003.

See also
Fed Cup structure

References

 Fed Cup Profile, Canada
 Fed Cup Profile, Mexico
 Fed Cup Profile, Bahamas
 Fed Cup Profile, Colombia
 Fed Cup Profile, Uruguay
 Fed Cup Profile, Paraguay
 Fed Cup Profile, Brazil
 Fed Cup Profile, El Salvador
 Fed Cup Profile, Bolivia
 Fed Cup Profile, Dominican Republic
 Fed Cup Profile, Chile
 Fed Cup Profile, Panama
 Fed Cup Profile, Cuba
 Fed Cup Profile, Jamaica
 Fed Cup Profile, Costa Rica
 Fed Cup Profile, Guatemala
 Fed Cup Profile, Trinidad and Tobago
 Fed Cup Profile, Eastern Caribbean

External links
 Fed Cup website

 
Americas
Sport in San Luis Potosí City
Tennis tournaments in Mexico
Sport in Havana
Tennis tournaments in Cuba
2002 in Cuban sport
Mex